Paraguay elects on the national level a head of state - the president -  and a legislature. The president is elected for a five-year term by the people. The National Congress (Congreso Nacional) has two chambers. The Chamber of Deputies (Cámara de Diputados) has 80 members, elected for a five-year term by proportional representation. The Chamber of Senators (Cámara de Senadores) has 45 members, elected for a five-year term by proportional representation.

Schedule

Election

Inauguration

Latest elections

President

Senate

Chamber of Deputies

See also
 Electoral calendar
 Electoral system

External links
Adam Carr's Election Archive